Dobârceni is a commune in Botoșani County,  Western Moldavia, Romania. It is composed of six villages: Bivolari, Brăteni (formerly Pădureni), Cișmănești, Dobârceni, Livada and Murguța.

References

Communes in Botoșani County
Localities in Western Moldavia